The Mount Kenya mole shrew (Surdisorex polulus) is a species of mammal in the family Soricidae endemic to Mount Kenya in Kenya. Its natural habitat is tropical high-altitude bamboo and grassland, particularly the bamboo-belt of Mount Kenya and the adjacent heath and grassland.

The Mt. Kenya mole shrew is listed as vulnerable because it is known to only be found in a single location in highlands of Mount Kenya, though a closely-related species, the Aberdare Mole Shrew, can be found on the nearby Aberdare range. The habitat of the species is dense montane grassland.

References

Surdisorex
Endemic fauna of Kenya
Mammals of Kenya
Mount Kenya
Taxonomy articles created by Polbot
Mammals described in 1916